Hopea ferrea is a species of tree in the family Dipterocarpaceae. It is native to Cambodia, Laos, Peninsular Malaysia, Thailand, and Vietnam.

It is the provincial tree of Amnat Charoen Province.

References

ferrea
Flora of Indo-China
Flora of Peninsular Malaysia
Taxonomy articles created by Polbot